María Margarita Martínez (born ) is a Colombian volleyball player. She is part of the Colombia women's national volleyball team. On club level she played for Liga Vallecaucana in 2015.

References

1995 births
Living people
Colombian women's volleyball players
Place of birth missing (living people)
Wing spikers
Pan American Games medalists in volleyball
Pan American Games silver medalists for Colombia
Volleyball players at the 2019 Pan American Games
Medalists at the 2019 Pan American Games
20th-century Colombian women
21st-century Colombian women